The Magic Cauldron may refer to:
 The Magic Cauldron (radio program), a New Zealand radio program
 "The Magic Cauldron" (essay), an essay by Eric S. Raymond

See also
 The Black Cauldron (disambiguation)